Alyaksandr Alhavik (born 18 April 1982) is a Belarusian former professional footballer.

External links
 Profile at teams.by
 

1982 births
Living people
Belarusian footballers
Association football defenders
FC Smorgon players
FC Molodechno players
FC Khimik Svetlogorsk players
FC Granit Mikashevichi players
FC Gorodeya players